In Greek mythology, Theano (Ancient Greek: Θεανώ) may refer to the following personages:

Theano, wife of Metapontus, king of Icaria. Metapontus demanded that she bear him children, or leave the kingdom. She presented the children of Melanippe to her husband, as if they were her own. Later Theano bore him two sons of her own and, wishing to leave the kingdom to her own children, sent them to kill Melanippe's. In the fight that ensued, her two sons were killed, and she committed suicide upon hearing the news.
Theano, one of the Danaïdes, daughter of Danaus and Polyxo. She married (and murdered) Phantes, son of Aegyptus and Caliadne.
Theano, a priestess of Athena in Troy during the Trojan War. She was a daughter of King Cisseus of Thrace and wife of Antenor, one of the Trojan elders.
Theano or Theona, a character appearing in the Aeneid, the consort of Amycus.

Notes

References

 Gaius Julius Hyginus, Fabulae from The Myths of Hyginus translated and edited by Mary Grant. University of Kansas Publications in Humanistic Studies. Online version at the Topos Text Project.
Homer, The Iliad with an English Translation by A.T. Murray, Ph.D. in two volumes. Cambridge, MA., Harvard University Press; London, William Heinemann, Ltd. 1924. Online version at the Perseus Digital Library.
Homer, Homeri Opera in five volumes. Oxford, Oxford University Press. 1920. Greek text available at the Perseus Digital Library.
Pseudo-Apollodorus, The Library with an English Translation by Sir James George Frazer, F.B.A., F.R.S. in 2 Volumes, Cambridge, MA, Harvard University Press; London, William Heinemann Ltd. 1921. Online version at the Perseus Digital Library. Greek text available from the same website.
 Publius Vergilius Maro, Aeneid. Theodore C. Williams. trans. Boston. Houghton Mifflin Co. 1910. Online version at the Perseus Digital Library.
 Publius Vergilius Maro, Bucolics, Aeneid, and Georgics. J. B. Greenough. Boston. Ginn & Co. 1900. Latin text available at the Perseus Digital Library.

Princesses in Greek mythology
Danaids
Trojans
Women of the Trojan war
People of the Trojan War
Characters in the Aeneid